Ron Chandraguptha (Peradeniya, Sri Lanka, born 22 February 1995) is a Sri Lankan cricketer. He made his first-class debut for Tamil Union Cricket and Athletic Club in the 2014–15 Premier Trophy on 30 January 2015. He was part of the Sri Lankan team which won the ACC Emerging Teams Asia Cup 2017. He made his Twenty20 debut on 8 January 2020, for Colombo Cricket Club in the 2019–20 SLC Twenty20 Tournament.

Ron is currently in a romantic relationship with a Senior Banker in Sri Lanka, Hiruni Bulathsinghala.

References

External links
 

1995 births
Living people
Sri Lankan cricketers
Colombo Cricket Club cricketers
Colombo District cricketers
Tamil Union Cricket and Athletic Club cricketers
Cricketers from Kandy